Tsou is a divergent Austronesian language spoken by the Tsou people of Taiwan. Tsou is a threatened language; however, this status is uncertain. Its speakers are located in the west-central mountains southeast of the Chiayi/Alishan area in Taiwan.

Name
The name Tsou literally means "person", from Proto-Austronesian *Cau through regular sound changes. It is therefore cognate with the name of the Thao.

Classification
Tsou has traditionally been considered part of a Tsouic branch of Austronesian. However, several recent classifications, such as Chang (2006) and Ross (2009) dispute the Tsouic branch, with Tsou more divergent than the other two languages, Kanakanabu and Saaroa.

Dialects
Tsou does not have much dialectal variation. There are four recorded dialects: Tapangʉ, Tfuya, Duhtu and Iimcu, of which Tapangʉ and Tfuya are still spoken. Iimcu has not been well described. The grammar of the other three dialects is nearly identical, and phonological variation is marginal: In certain environments, Tapangʉ /i/ corresponds to Tfuya and Duhtu /z/ or /iz/, and Duhtu had /r/ for Tfuya and Tapangʉ /j/ (Actually, older speakers had been recorded to vary between [ɹ] and [j], but at that point the dialect was moribund.).

Tsou is spoken in the following villages: All of the villages are located in Alishan Township, Chiayi County except for Mamahavana (Jiumei), which is located in Hsinyi/Xinyi Township, Nantou County. Both the native Tsou names and Chinese names are given.

Tapangʉ (Tapaŋʉ)
Tapangʉ 達邦 (Dabang)
Nia'ucna/Nibiei 里佳 (Lijia)
Saviki 山美 (Shanmei)
Sinvi 新美 (Xinmei)

Tfuya (Tfuya)
Cayamavana 茶山 (Chashan)
Dadauya 樂野 (Leye)
Ranguu/Pnguu/Dadangia 來吉 (Laiji)

Duhtu (Luhtu)
Mamahavana 久美 (Jiumei)

Iimucu – extinct

Phonology
The description of Tsou phonology below is from Wright & Ladefoged (1994).

Vowels
Tsou has six vowels, . Vowel sequences occur, including sequences of like vowels ( etc.), but these are separate moras rather than long vowels or diphthongs. Vowels, especially back vowels, are centralized when flanked by voiceless alveolar consonants. The sound /ɨ/ ~ /ʉ/ has been written <x>, possibly the only case in the world of x representing a vowel.

Consonants

However, stress assignment and restrictions on consonant clusters (see stress and phonotactics below) demonstrate that they behave as consonants.

The plosives are not aspirated. Phonetically aspirated stops are actually sequences of stop plus , as can be seen by the fact that they cannot cluster with a third consonant (see phonotactics below), and by morphological alternations such as  ~  "to trade".

According to spectrum analysis,  appears to be a glottal fricative in most environments, but approaches a velar  next to the central vowel , as in  'palm, sole'. However, the fact that the sequences  and  occur, when no other homorganic sequence is allowed, suggests that  and  may not both be glottal. (Additional evidence that  might best be analyzed as velar is the fact that  is not found, and that  is only found medially, in the single known word  "fox".)

However, the voiced sibilant  is not affected by this environment.

Both may be glottalized ( or maybe ) in intervocalic position. In addition, alveolar  has some unusual allophony: About a third of speakers pronounce it with a lateral release, or before  as a lateral approximant , as in  "maple". Indeed, Tsuchida (1976) transcribed it as a preglottalized lateral, .

Stress
With a few exceptions, stress is not only predictable, but shifts when suffixes are added to a word. It falls on the penultimate vowel, or on the penultimate mora if a moraic analysis is adopted. That is, a final heavy syllable (double vowel) receives stress ( "house"); otherwise, stress falls on the penultimate syllable ( "his child"). Additional stress falls in a trochaic pattern: Every other light syllable (single vowel) also receives stress. Unstressed vowels are deleted, except at word boundaries (initial or final vowel) and unless doing so would create a forbidden consonant cluster (see below).

However, this does not explain all consonant clusters, many of which are lexically determined.

Phonotactics
The most complex syllable in Tsou is CCVV. Tsou is unusual in the number of consonant clusters that it allows. Homorganic clusters are not allowed, unless one is a nasal consonant, and a maximum of two consonants may occur together, but otherwise about half of possible sequences are known to occur. For example, all non-homorganic sequences starting with /t/ and /ts/ are found. Missing clusters may not be allowed, or may simply be accidental gaps due to limited knowledge of the lexicon.

{|
!Initial or medial!!Medial only
|-
|||
|-
|||
|-
|||
|-
|||
|-
|||
|-
||| 
|-
| || 
|-
|||—
|-
|—||
|-
|||
|-
|||
|-
|||
|-
|||
|-
|||
|}
In clusters of oral stops, both have an audible release burst. This is true even between vowels, an environment where the first stop has no audible release in most languages, supporting an analysis of these clusters as part of the syllable onset, with no syllable codas occurring in the language.

Stops, oral or nasal, may or may not have a release burst before a nasal stop, depending on the speaker. The initial clusters  are unusual cross-linguistically. ( is again notably missing, except intervocalically, despite the fact that  is the most common ejective cross-linguistically.)

Grammar

Syntax
Like most other Austronesian languages, Tsou displays a predicate-initial syntax.

Tsou has three main types of questions.
Yes-no questions
Alternative questions
Wh-questions (information questions)

Tsou has the following types of clauses:
Verbal
Declarative
Imperative
(Verbal) interrogative
Equational
Existential (no auxiliary verbs are allowed)

Important function words are:
zou – "to be"
'a – "it is in case that"
o'ta – (it is) not (in case that)"
pan – "there is" / existential
uk'a – negative existential (usually followed by ci)
o'a – negation of a fact or event
ci – relativizer
o – prohibition (AV constructions)av'a – prohibition (UV constructions)

Case markers are as follows, with nominative forms placed before slashes and oblique forms placed after them (Zeitoun 2005:274). The nominative form is given when there are no slashes.
'''e – visible and near speaker
si / ta – visible and near hearer
ta – visible but away from speakero / to – invisible and far away, or newly introduced to discoursena / no ~ ne – non-identifiable and non-referential (often when scanning a class of elements)

Word classes
Tsou nouns are distinguished from verbs by the presence of case markers and suffixed genitive pronouns, both of which cannot be applied to verbs. Verbs, on the other hand, have elaborate voice marking. Adjectives and certain adverbs actually function as verbs, since they also undergo voice inflection and are placed at the same positions within clauses as verbs (i.e., predicate-initial).

Tsou is unique for not having any preposition-like elements, instead using nouns or verbs to express these notions.

Verbs
Main verbs can take on four types of voices, the actor voice and three undergoer voices, which are marked by suffixes.Chang and Pan (2018):49
Actor voice: m-, b-, <m>, or øPatient voice: -aLocative voice: -iInstrumental/benefactive voice: -(n)eniTsou verbs can be divided into five major classes (I, II, III-1, III-2, IV, V-1, V-2) based on morphological alternations (Zeitoun 2005:285). Tsou verbs do not have as many morphological distinctions as other Formosan languages do, since the Tsou language makes more extensive use of auxiliary verbs. For instance, there are no temporal/aspectual distinctions, separate markings for imperatives, and stative/dynamic distinctions. Nevertheless, Tsou still preserves the causative poa- (allomorphs: p-, pa-).

Tsou auxiliary verbs can carry temporal/aspectual and modal information as well as voice. They are marked for the following voices:
Actor voice (AV)
Undergoer voice (UV), or sometimes referred to as non-actor voice (NAV)

These auxiliary verbs can be divided into three classes:
AV constructions – mio, mo, mi-, moso, mo(h)-UV constructions – i-, o(h)-AV/UV constructions – te, ta, tena, nte, ntoso, nto(h)-, laTsou has the following aspectual suffixes:-cu/-c'u – already-n'a – still, just, about to-la – once

Pronouns
The personal pronouns below are from the Tfuya dialect of Tsou, and are sourced from Zeitoun (2005:265). Note that third-person pronouns are distinguished between those that are visible or non-visible.

Numerals
Tfuya Tsou numerals are:
coni ; 10. m-as-kʉ
yuso ; 20. m-pus-ku
tuyu ; 30. m-tuyu-hu
sʉptʉ ; 40. m-sʉptʉ-hʉ
eimo ; 50. m-eimo-hʉ
nomʉ ; 60. m-onmʉ-hʉ
pitu ; 70. m-pʉtvʉ-hʉ
voyu ; 80. m-voyvʉ-hʉ
sio ; 90. m-sio-hʉ

Tens are derived with the circumfix (confix) m- -hʉ''. There is also a u/ʉ vowel harmony phenomenon.

Language endangerment

These people live in the mountainous areas because dominating colonizers were in Taiwan for over 380 years. Outsiders have killed the indigenous people, burned villages, and forced them to move as the colonizers claimed more and more spaces. Some such colonizers were the Dutch, Spanish, Japanese, and Chinese. The outside rulers imposed their own education systems on the indigenous people, but the most notable influence came from the Kuomintang era, where Taiwanese people were forced to use Mandarin and where children were punished at school if they used their own indigenous language. This forced the original Taiwanese people to give up their language in order to survive in the new, imposed environment.

Due to globalization, people are always in search of finding better lives if they’re not completely happy, and young people are leaving the villages and looking for jobs in big cities. Because of this, children are not using the language and are not getting exposed to the culture as frequently, which means the language is not getting passed down to future generations.

One survey from 1999 found that only 9% of the indigenous children could speak their native language, and most children preferred to use Mandarin, which is the official Taiwan language. Tsou is mostly used by community elders in ceremonies and certain gatherings. Unfortunately, since the parents are not fluent and do not view the language as practical for children, the language is rarely spoken at home. The language is found more in school settings where children attend cultural learning programs.

The Tsou language is recognized by the government. The government has allocated money dedicated to bring language programs to elementary and junior high schools, but the funds are sometimes inconsistent, which negatively affects the programs. It helped that the Martial law was lifted in 1987 and that people could freely speak their native languages again, however, so many other dominant languages were used that several native indigenous languages disappeared.

The elders care about their language and worry that it may not survive in the future, so they welcome any help linguists may provide. In addition, the community has programs to maintain the language. One example is when children get to sing Tsou folk songs in kindergarten and continue to become exposed to other cultural programs through elementary school. People are relying heavily on these kids to keep the language, music, and culture alive. There are programs for elementary and middle school kids to learn the language. Community members are very willing to get involved with events. It is difficult to teach the language because there is a lack of good teaching materials. Schools do not make learning the indigenous language a priority because if an event deemed more important occurs, teachers are likely to put off the language lesson. In addition, students have to worry about studying English, Mandarin, and entrance exam materials, so time is limited and the ethnic language is not a priority in the minds of the younger generation.

See also
 Formosan languages
 Tsouic languages

Notes

References

Further reading

External links

 Ogawa's Vocabulary of Formosan Dialects 小川尚義 (臺灣蕃語蒐録) 
 Tsou radio recordings (RB1-009, RB1-010) archived with the Robert Blust collection at Kaipuleohone
 Yuánzhùmínzú yǔyán xiànshàng cídiǎn 原住民族語言線上詞典  – Tsou search page at the "Aboriginal language online dictionary" website of the Indigenous Languages Research and Development Foundation
 Tsou teaching and leaning materials published by the Council of Indigenous Peoples of Taiwan 

Formosan languages
Tsou people
Endangered Austronesian languages